Roskilde Festival 2008 was held 3–6 July 2008 with warm-up and camping from 29 June.

Band list

18th Dye (DK/DE)
A Kid Hereafter (DK)
Aaron (FR)
Alberta in Love (DK/E)
Albertslund Terror korps (DK)
Alphabeat (DK)
Anti-Flag (US)
The Asteroids Galaxy Tour (DK)
At the Gates (S)
Nicole Atkins & the Sea (US)
August (DK)
Awadi (SEN)
Babylove & The Van Dangos (DK)
DJ Badboe (DK)
Band of Horses (US)
DJ Banel (DK)
Battles (US)
Beardyman (UK)
Beta Satan (DK)
Black Mountain (CAN)
The Black Seeds (NZ)
Bloodgroup (ISL)
Thomas Boberg (DK)
Bonnie 'Prince' Billy (US)
Boom Clap Bachelors (DK)
Bullet for My Valentine (UK)
Burhan G (DK)
Solomon Burke (US)
Cadence Weapon (CAN)
The Campell Brothers (US)
Canon Blue (US)
Casiokids (N)
Cat Power (US)
The Chemical Brothers (UK)
Choir of Young Believers (DK)
Clutch (US)
CocoRosie (US)
The Cound & Sinden (UK)
Culcha Candela (DE)
Dan Deacon (US)
Dee Pee (DK)
Dengue Fever (US/CAMB)
Tina Dickow (DK)
Digitalism (DE)
The Dillinger Escape Plan (US)
DJ Disse (DK)
DSL (FR)
Dub Tracktor & Opiate (DK)
Duffy (UK)
Dunkelbunt (A)
The Dø (FIN/FR)
Efterklang (DK)
August Engkilde (DK)
Enter Shikari (UK)
Extra Golden (US/KEN)
Familjen (SE)
The Fashion (DK) 
Gnarls Barkley (US)
The Grand (NO)
Holy Fuck (CAN)
Isam B (DK)
Jay-Z (US)
Job for a Cowboy (US)
Judas Priest (UK)
Kate Ryan (BE)
Kings of Leon (US)
L.O.C. (DK)
M.I.A. (UK) (cancelled due to ill health)
Majors (DK)
Miss Platnum (DE)
Mugison (ISL)
My Bloody Valentine (IRL/UK)
Neil Young (CAN)
The Notwist (DE)
Pilgrimz (DK)
Radiohead (UK)
The Raveonettes (DK)
Robyn (SE)
Rotten Sound (FIN)
Shantel & Bucovina Club Orkestar (DE)
Shape of Broad Minds (US)
Slayer (US)
Soraya Arnelas (ES)
Spleen United (DK)
The Streets (UK)
Teitur (FO)
Tivoli Symphony Orchestra (DK)
Tinchy Stryder & JME (UK)
Tumi and the Volume (ZA)
Veto (DK)
Vieux Farka Touré (MALI)
Yeasayer (US)
Kate Nash (UK)
Lupe Fiasco (US)

External links

Roskilde Festival by year
2008 in Danish music
2008 music festivals